Ria van Dyke (born 16 February 1989) is a New Zealand model and beauty pageant titleholder who was crowned Miss Universe New Zealand 2010. Van Dyke represented New Zealand at the Miss Universe 2010 in Las Vegas, Nevada, US, but unplaced.

Personal life 
Van Dyke was born in Kawerau, in the Eastern Bay of Plenty, New Zealand. She graduated from the University of Auckland with a Bachelor of Arts in 2010 and a BA(Hons) with first-class honours in sociology in 2012.

References 

1989 births
Living people
University of Auckland alumni
Miss Universe 2010 contestants
Miss New Zealand winners
People from Kawerau
New Zealand women in business
21st-century New Zealand women